Spinochrome E, 2,3,5,6,7,8-Hexahydroxy-1,4-naphthalenedione, also called hexahydroxynaphthoquinone  is a polyhydroxylated 1,4-naphthoquinones,  pigments found in sea urchin shell ("test"), spine, gonads, coelomic fluid, and eggs, of sea urchin commonly known as spinochromes. These natural phenolic compounds are quinones that are known to have pharmacological properties. The several hydroxyl groups are appropriate for free-radical scavenging, which diminishes ROS and prevents redox imbalance. Mechanisms are described such as scavenging of reactive oxygen species (ROS), interaction with lipid peroxide radicals, chelation of metal ions, inhibition of lipid peroxidation and regulation of the cell redox potential.    
  
Spinochrome E formula  shows that have one extra hydroxyl group that Echinochrome A and it is formally derived from naphthoquinone (1,4-naphtalenedione) through replacement of all six hydrogen atoms by hydroxyl (OH) groups. The numerical prefixes "2,3,5,6,7,8" are superfluous, since there is no other hexahydroxy derivative of 1,4-naphthoquinone.

Spinochrome from sea urchins, in oriental culture, are known for its health benefits. The sea urchin appears in the "Materia medica" of the Ming Dynasty author by Li Zhongli in 1647 and the benefits cited are for the heart, bones, blood and also it counteracts impotence. Today it is known the benefits for the health of these compounds.

The compound can be produced by condensation of 3,4,5,6-tetramethoxyphthalaldehyde with glyoxal.

See also 
 Hexahydroxy-2,3-naphthalenedione, a structural isomer.
 Tetrahydroxybenzoquinone
 Octahydroxyanthraquinone

References 
 H. A. Anderson and R. H. Thomson (1966), Naturally Occurring Quinones. Part VIP Synthesis of Spinochrome E. J. Chem. Soc. series C (Organic), pages 426-428. 
 T. W. Goodwin, E. Lederer and L. Musajo (1951), The nomenclature of the spinochromes of sea urchins. Cellular and Molecular Life Sciences, Volume 7, Number 10, pages 375-376. 
 Shikov, A.N.; Pozharitskaya, O.N.; Krishtopina, A.S.; Makarov, V.G. Naphthoquinone pigments from sea urchins: Chemistry and pharmacology. Phytochem. Rev. 2018, 17, 509–534. 
 Brasseur, L.; Hennebert, E.; Fievez, L.; Caulier, G.; Bureau, F.; Tafforeau, L.; Flammang, P.; Gerbaux, P.; Eeckhaut, I. The Roles of Spinochromes in Four Shallow Water Tropical Sea Urchins and Their Potential as Bioactive Pharmacological Agents. Mar. Drugs 2017, 15, 179.  Diversity of Polyhydroxynaphthoquinone Pigments in North Pacific Sea Urchins. Chem. Biodivers. 2017, 14, e1700182. 
 Nishibori, K. Isolation of Echinochrome A from the Spines of the Sea Urchin, Diadema setosum (Leske). Nature 1959, 184, 1234.
 Martínez, M.J.A.; Benito, P.B. Biological Activity of Quinones. In Studies in Natural Products Chemistry; Elsevier BV: Amsterdam, The Netherlands, 2005; Volume 30, pp. 303–366. 
 Zhou, D.-Y.; Qin, L.; Zhu, B.-W.; Wang, X.-D.; Tan, H.; Yang, J.-F.; Li, D.-M.; Dong, X.-P.; Wu, H.-T.; Sun, L.-M.; et al. Extraction and antioxidant property of polyhydroxylated naphthoquinone pigments from spines of purple sea urchin Strongylocentrotus nudus. Food Chem. 2011, 129, 1591–1597. 
 Hou, Y., Vasileva, E. A., Carne, A., McConnell, M., Bekhit, A. E. D. A., & Mishchenko, N. P. (2018). Naphthoquinones of the spinochrome class: Occurrence, isolation, biosynthesis and biomedical applications. RSC advances, 8(57), 32637-32650. 
 Rubilar, T., Barbieri, E. S., Gazquez, A., & Avaro, M. (2021). Sea Urchin Pigments: Echinochrome A and Its Potential Implication in the Cytokine Storm Syndrome. Marine Drugs, 19(5), 267. 
 Kim, H.K., Vasileva, E.A., Mishchenko, N.P., Fedoreyev, S.E. and Han, J. (2021) Multifaceted Clinical Effects of Echinochrome. Marine Drugs, 19, 412. 

1,4-Naphthoquinones
Hydroxynaphthoquinones